{|
{{Infobox ship image
|Ship image=File:Ceara (S14) sail on display.jpg
|Ship caption=Cearás sail preserved in Fortaleza.
}}

|}USS Amberjack (SS-522)''', a Tench-class submarine, was the second submarine of the United States Navy named for the amberjack, a vigorous sport fish found in the western Atlantic from New England to Brazil.

 Commissioning 
Her keel was laid down by the Boston Naval Shipyard of Boston, Massachusetts, on 8 February 1944. She was launched on 15 December 1944 sponsored by Mrs. Walter E. Lang, Jr., and commissioned on 4 March 1946.

 Shakedown and first conversion 
Following shakedown training in the West Indies and in the Gulf of Mexico, Amberjack reported on 17 June for duty with SubRon8. Operating out of the Submarine Base, New London, Connecticut, she conducted training missions in the North Atlantic, and, in November 1946, made a cruise above the Arctic Circle. In January 1947, the submarine entered the Portsmouth Naval Shipyard for extensive modifications and thereafter spent about a year undergoing a Greater Underwater Propulsion Power Program (GUPPY) conversion during which her hull and sail were streamlined and additional batteries and a snorkel were installed to increase her submerged speed endurance, and maneuverability. In January 1948, she reported for duty with SubRon4 based at Key West, Florida. She operated along the east coast and in the West Indies for a little more than 11 years. Her schedule included the development of tactics and independent ship exercises, type training, periodic overhauls, and fleet exercises. During this period, she also visited numerous Caribbean Sea ports. In July 1952, Amberjack was transferred to the newly established SubRon12, though she remained based at Key West and her employment continued as before.

 European and NATO Exercises 
Early in August 1959, after more than 11 years of operations out of Key West, the submarine's home port was changed to Charleston, South Carolina. She arrived there on 8 August and reported for duty with her former squadron, SubRon4. While working out of her new home port, Amberjacks operations remained much as they had been before with one significant difference: she began making deployments to European waters. In August, September and October 1960, the submarine participated in a NATO exercise before making a week-long port visit to Portsmouth, England. She returned to Charleston late in October and resumed her normal duties. Between May and September 1961, the warship deployed to the Mediterranean Sea for duty in the Sixth Fleet. After a three-year interlude operating along the east coast and in the West Indies, Amberjack made another Mediterranean cruise between 7 July and 1 November 1964. She spent the ensuing 29 months working out of Charleston. In 1967, the submarine made a three-month deployment to the Mediterranean between 23 April and 24 July. This claim has not been substantiated. On 2 September 1969, following another 25 months of operations along the US east coast and in the West Indies, she embarked upon her last deployment from Charleston in European waters during which she participated in another NATO exercise with units of the British, Canadian, and Dutch navies. At the conclusion of the exercise, Amberjack visited a number of ports in northern Europe before returning to Charleston on 12 December 1969.

 End of Service 
On 9 July 1970, Amberjack arrived in her new home port, Key West, Florida, her base for the remainder of her service in the United States Navy.  She made her last deployment to the Mediterranean between 27 November 1972, and 30 March 1973.  On 17 October 1973, Amberjack was decommissioned at Key West, her name was struck from the Naval Vessel Register, was transferred to the Brazilian Navy, and was commissioned as Ceará (S-14)'''.

References 

Tench-class submarines
Ships built in Boston
1944 ships
World War II submarines of the United States
Cold War submarines of the United States
Tench-class submarines of the Brazilian Navy